Jack Farris may refer to:
 Jack B. Farris (1935–2019), United States Army general
 Jack K. Farris (born 1934), United States Air Force general